Shamblord was an old name given to two towns on the Isle of Wight, which have since been renamed.
 Cowes
 East Cowes